Anthony George "Aussie" Malcolm (born 11 December 1940) is a former National Party politician in New Zealand.

Early years
Malcolm was born in Melbourne, Australia, in 1940. He was educated in Canada and Australia (Sydney Church of England Grammar School), and then attended Wellington College and Victoria University of Wellington. He was the son of Joseph Anthony Malcolm, a New Zealand government official serving overseas.

Malcolm's early career was as a social worker with the Child Welfare Division of the Department of Education in Wellington and Palmerston North but by the mid 1970s he was owner of Malcolm & Hansard Ltd, an accredited advertising agency in Auckland.

Member of Parliament

Malcolm became the member of parliament for the Eden electorate in 1975, defeating Mike Moore, remaining there until he was in turn defeated in 1984 by Richard Northey.

Cabinet minister
Malcolm was a cabinet minister during the third term of the Muldoon National government, serving at various times as Associate Minister of Transport, Civil Aviation and Railways, Minister of Health, and Minister of Immigration.

Rail
As Associate to Colin McLachlan, Malcolm's focus was on New Zealand Railways. He managed the transition from government department to corporation, upgraded Wellington's commuter services with Hungarian built Ganz-Marvag electric units, electrified commuter services to Paraparaumu and commenced electrification of the main trunk line.

Immigration
Malcolm became involved with Immigration as Parliamentary Under Secretary to Jim Bolger in 1977 and continued, as Minister, until 1984. Malcolm made wide use of his ministerial discretion to stop dawn raid deportations when children or other exceptional circumstances were involved, laying the foundation for many Pacifica families now well settled in New Zealand. His response to the Indo-Chinese refugee crisis was the foundation for New Zealand refugee policies that persist to the present and are still well regarded internationally. For both approaches he received criticism from the political right. Later, by issuing visas to the 1981 Springboks, he received criticism from the political left. Malcolm was highly interventionist, making many individual case decisions and instituting policies some regarded as "quirky", at the time; such as permitting restaurants to employ ethnic chefs to improve cuisine; Chinese market gardeners to employ family members to replace their own children who were moving into the professions; the entry of skilled musicians and artists; and the first "entrepreneur" policy. Malcolm's liberalism saw an increase in non-white migration, especially as "special cases", but he persisted with the Eurocentric policy of only accepting mainstream occupational migrants from "traditional source" countries. After widespread review and submissions his new Immigration Bill was to undertake its second reading the night Muldoon announced the snap election in 1984. That legislation re-emerged later as the Labour-sponsored Immigration Act of 1987.

Tobacco
As the Minister of Health during the 1981–84 National government, Malcolm features in a 1985 tobacco industry document, a report written by a Tobacco Institute of America official who had visited New Zealand. The official was accompanied by Donald Hoel, a lawyer in the US law firm Shook, Hardy & Bacon, who worked for the tobacco industry.

The document described a February 1985 lunch meeting attended by Michael Thompson of the Tobacco Institute of New Zealand, people from the tobacco company Rothmans and the local British American Tobacco branch.

Later years
In 1984 Malcolm was involved in the KZ 7 campaign, joining the project as campaign director. The team finished second in the 1987 Louis Vuitton Cup. Malcolm later established Malcolm Pacific Limited, an immigration consultancy firm, where he remains a Director.

In 1999 Malcolm and diving friend Jeroen Jongejans formed Dive! Tutukaka, New Zealand's largest dive charter company, operating at the Poor Knights Islands. Malcolm no longer has a financial interest in the company.

Family
On 27 February 1965, Malcolm married Astrid Margaret Silver, the daughter of F. B. Silver. Astrid Malcolm was elected to the Auckland City Council for the Mount Eden ward on the Citizens & Ratepayers ticket from 1989 to 1998. She died of a suspected embolism during a diving accident at the Poor Knights Islands in 2000. The couple had one son and three daughters.

Notes

References

External links 
Dive! Tutukaka company website, The Dive! Story
Malcolm Pacific company website

|-

1940 births
People educated at Wellington College (New Zealand)
Living people
Members of the Cabinet of New Zealand
New Zealand National Party MPs
Members of the New Zealand House of Representatives
New Zealand MPs for Auckland electorates
Unsuccessful candidates in the 1984 New Zealand general election
Australian expatriates in Canada
Australian emigrants to New Zealand